Brian Shaw (born February 26, 1982) is an American professional strongman, who is widely regarded as one of the greatest strength athletes of all-time. He won the 2011, 2013, 2015, and 2016 World's Strongest Man competitions, and in 2011, became the first man to win the Arnold Strongman Classic and the World's Strongest Man competitions in the same calendar year, a feat he replicated in 2015. With 26 international competition wins, he is the fourth most decorated strongman in history behind Lithuania's Žydrūnas Savickas, Poland's Mariusz Pudzianowski and Iceland's Hafþór Júlíus Björnsson.

Early life
Shaw was born in Fort Lupton, Colorado, on February 26, 1982, the son of Jay and Bonnie Shaw. It has been noted that he had uncles of exceptional stature. 

At Fort Lupton High School, Shaw excelled in basketball. He then attended Otero Junior College in La Junta, Colorado. There, he was able to form an inside combination with current Louisiana State University-Alexandria Head Women's Basketball Coach Bob Austin. Shaw was one of the team leaders for the Rattlers in his sophomore season. Following Otero, he went to Black Hills State University where he was on a full basketball scholarship and received a degree in wellness management.

During his basketball career, Shaw was "hooked on the weights" and he has said that the weight room was his "sanctuary". In his own words, "I've always been able to do this. The biggest tire, the heaviest stone... I've always been able to walk up and lift it. Odd strength is what it is, not weight-room strength. It's brute strength."

Career

2005–2006
Shaw began his career as a strongman with a win when he entered the Denver Strongest Man contest in October 2005. He had entered with no formal training. Just seven months later in June 2006, he joined the professional ranks and his successes continued.

2009
He then competed in Romania in the World Strongman Super Series. In September, he travelled to his second World's Strongest Man contest in Valletta. There he was grouped in what was termed the "group of death" not least because of his presence in it. Alongside him in this group was Zydrunas Savickas who went on to win the title. Although Savickas won the group, he and Shaw were separated by just two points. In the final, Shaw went on to attain a podium finish, something Randell Strossen of IronMind had predicted would happen when he said "he has to be considered a favorite for a podium position. If he can stay healthy, there's no end to what he could do. He's got these gifts. He's the total package."

2010
Shaw qualified for the finals at the 2010 World's Strongest Man in Sun City, South Africa in September 2010. He was tied for the lead at the end of the finals with Zydrunas Savickas and lost by countback, a system of scoring based on how the athletes placed in each event throughout the finals. Savickas had higher overall placings (2 first places and 1 second place out of 6 events) than Shaw (2 first places and 1 fourth place out of 6 events) and won the 2010 title.

Shaw competed against Savickas again in October 2010 at the Giants Live Istanbul contest. Shaw again finished second behind Savickas.

Shaw won the inaugural Jón Páll Sigmarsson Classic on November 21, 2010.

Shaw won the Strongman Super Series Swedish Grand Prix and became the 2010 overall Super Series champion on December 18, 2010. This was Shaw's second consecutive overall Super Series championship.

2011–2013
In 2011, Shaw once again participated in the World's Strongest man competition.  Going into the final event, the Atlas Stones, Shaw was tied with two-time champion Zydrunas Savickas.  Shaw beat Savickas taking 1st place.  In the 2013 competition, Shaw led Savickas into the final event (again the Atlas Stones) and again beat Savickas to win the competition. He broke Savickas' record in the deadlift lifting 442.5 kg (975.5 lbs).

2015–2016
Brian Shaw also won the 2015 and 2016 World's Strongest Man competitions.

2017
In 2017, Shaw competed in both the World's Strongest Man and the Arnold Strongman Classic competitions. Shaw won the Arnold Strongman Classic, but later in the year, he finished 3rd at the World's Strongest Man with Eddie Hall defeating him by coming in at 1st place.

2018

2018 World's Strongest Man
Brian secured another podium finish after emerging 3rd behind the winner Hafþór Júlíus Björnsson and runner up Mateusz Kieliszkowski.

2018 Arnold Strongman Classic
In March 2018, Shaw competed in the 2018 Arnold Strongman Classic, where he placed 2nd in Event One: The Bag Over Bar, 4th in Event Two: The Stone Shoulder, 2nd in Event Three: The Timber Carry, 3rd in Event Four: The Rogue Elephant Bar Deadlift, and 2nd in Event Five: Apollon's Wheel leaving him in 2nd place overall with 41.5 points to winner Hafþór Júlíus Björnsson's 46.

2018 World's Ultimate Strongman
In October 2018, Shaw competed in the World's Ultimate Strongman competition in Dubai.  Shaw struggled with some of the events including the deadlift where he had trained with a different bar height and the yoke walk where the stage cracked under the combined weight of Shaw and the yoke, causing him to briefly drop the yoke and increase his time. Shaw still performed well, lifting all the objects in the overhead medley and was separated from Hafthor Bjornsson by 5.5 points going into the sixth and final event. In the sixth and final event, the Atlas Stones, Shaw lifted all five stones but this was not enough to surpass Bjornsson in the final points tally, leaving Shaw in second place.

2019
Shaw secured 6th place at the World's strongest man, 8th place at the Arnold Strongman Classic and 4th place at the World's Ultimate Strongman.

2020

2020 World's Strongest Man
On November 15, 2020, Shaw placed fifth overall at the 2020 World's Strongest Man competition, failing to make the podium. Shaw placed seventh in the Giant's Medley, fifth in the partial deadlift, sixth in the Hercules Hold, and seventh in the Log Ladder.

2020 Shaw Classic
On December 11, 2020, he hosted the first Shaw Classic competition. Shaw hosted, organized, and paid out the purses for the competition. Rogue provided equipment for the competition with Trifecta announced as a sponsor. Shaw invited an All-Star cast of ten Strongmen to compete including the reigning Worlds Strongest Man Oleksii Novikov (who finished third.) Shaw would end up winning the competition and forfeiting his winning purse giving the winners share to the rest of the athletes. All ten competitors walked away with a share of the winning pool which included money Shaw invested, GoFundMe donations, and pay per view earnings.

2021 
2021 World's Strongest Man

In the 2021 World's Strongest Man Competition Shaw placed 2nd behind Scottish Strongman Tom Stoltman, his first podium finish since 2018. In the event he qualified for his record 13th WSM final, breaking a tie held by him and Zydrunas Savickas. All 13 of these finals were consecutive, another record. He also extended his own record by appearing in his 14th consecutive WSM contest, and equaled the record 10 podium finishes of Savickas. Shaw also set a new world record in the keg toss for height, crossing a height of 7.75 meters (his previous record of 7.25m was broken by 4 other men in the competition). Brian also won 7th place at the Rogue Invitational.

2022 
In the 2022 World's Strongest Man Competition, he secured the 4th position and emerged runner up at the 2022 Shaw Classic Strongman Championship.

Competitive record

Personal records
Done in the gym
 Squat – 
 Bench press –  × 2
 Deadlift –  - (Barbell used for this lift was setup equivalent to the elephant bar to simulate its properties) 
 Deadlift (from blocks / 15") – 
 Rack Pull –  (weight resistance measured at very top of rack pull. The lift was done using resistance bands and a belt squat machine.)
 Trap Bar Deadlift -  x 8
 Log Press – 
 Indoor Rowing – 100 meters in 12.8 seconds (unofficial world record at the time, since beaten by Loren Howard with 12.6)
Grip training records
 3rd furthest Dinnie Stone carry (2nd furthest with the original stones) – 
Pinch grip and lifting a pair of York 45lb plates
Captains of Crush grippers – No.3 (127 kg / 280 lb) certification
 Inch Dumbbell one hand clean (grip) –  with a 2 3/8" (6.03 cm) diameter handle
Millennium Dumbbell one hand clean (grip), left and right - 228lb (106kg) dumbbell with 2 3/8” (6.03cm) handle 

Strongman
done in official Strongman competition
 Ironmind S-Cubed Bar Deadlift (with straps) –  (World's Strongest Man 2017)
 Ironmind S-Cubed Bar Deadlift at partial deficit (with straps) –  (World's Strongest Man 2016)
 Rogue Elephant Bar Deadlift (with straps) –  (Arnold Strongman Classic 2016 & 2019)
 Hummer Tire Strongman Deadlift (with straps) – 
 Log Lift –  × 2
 Axle Press –  (Giants Live London 2011)
 Atlas Stone/Manhood Stone – 560 lb (254 kg) over 4' bar
 Keg Toss – 8 kegs in 16.59 seconds (World's Strongest Man 2014)
 Keg Toss – 7.75m (World's Strongest Man 2021, world record)
 Conan's Wheel of Pain –  28.96 meters (95 1/16 feet) (2019 Arnold Strongman Classic)

Personal life
Following the death of fellow American strongman Mike Jenkins in 2013, Shaw dated his widow Keri. They were engaged in 2014 and married in 2015. The couple have two sons, Braxton and Kellen, and they live in Brighton, Colorado.

In other media
Shaw has a YouTube channel, SHAWSTRENGTH, which has videos of training footage, fitness and strength challenges, and eating challenges. Eddie Hall is also seen occasionally on his videos.

Shaw also was one of four strongmen to be featured in the History Channel series, The Strongest Man in History, which premiered on July 10, 2019. On the first episode of the show, he pulled a  viking ship on a  incline course in 44.05 seconds.

See also
 List of strongmen

References

External links

 

1982 births
Living people
American sportsmen
American strength athletes
Black Hills State University alumni
People from Weld County, Colorado